Nicholas Kasirer is a puisne justice of the Supreme Court of Canada. He was sworn into office on September 16, 2019.

Kasirer was previously a justice with the Quebec Court of Appeal between 2009 and 2019. He is a graduate of the McGill University Faculty of Law, where he served as an editor for the McGill Law Journal, and where he later served as a professor from 1989 to 2009 and dean of the Faculty from 2003 to 2009.

He has written more than a dozen books on legal matters and taught classes on the law of obligations, property law, family law, and wills and estates law in both civil and common law.

On July 10, 2019, Kasirer was nominated to the Supreme Court of Canada by Prime Minister Justin Trudeau. On August 7, 2019, he was officially appointed to the Supreme Court of Canada effective as of September 16, 2019.

Books
 Kasirer, Nicholas (2003), Le droit civil, avant tout un style?, Montréal, Les Éditions Themis, Canada.

Honorary degrees
On September 22, 2012, the Université de Sherbrooke granted an honorary doctoral degree to Kasirer.

References

Judges in Quebec
Academic staff of the McGill University Faculty of Law
Living people
McGill University Faculty of Law alumni
Justices of the Supreme Court of Canada
21st-century Canadian judges
Year of birth missing (living people)